Diospyros cordata is a small tree in the family Ebenaceae. The specific epithet  is from the Latin meaning "heart-shaped", referring to the leaf base. D. cordata is endemic to Borneo and known only from Sarawak.

References

cordata
Endemic flora of Borneo
Trees of Borneo
Flora of Sarawak
Plants described in 1873